Nili Latu, playing name of Otenili Langilangi (born 19 February 1982) is a Tongan rugby union footballer. In 2018, Latu left Newcastle Falcons after helping Falcons achieve 4th in the Aviva Premiership, the highest finish in 20 years. He moved to Japan to continue playing rugby.

Latu started his rugby at Bay of Plenty in the Air New Zealand Cup. He made his debut for the Chiefs in 2005 in a match against the Sharks. He made his debut for Tonga on June 4, 2006 against Japan. He then played against Fiji, and in his third Test, skippered Tonga against the Junior All Blacks, and then against the Cook Islands. He was used as a replacement in the match against Samoa, and then captained the side against the second Test against the Cook Islands.

In late 2006 Latu was drafted into the Hurricanes squad as cover for All Black absentees Jerry Collins and Rodney So'oialo for the 2007 season. He played in the 2007 Rugby World Cup for Tonga where he was instrumental for their National Team. He also made a name for himself with his big tackles.
In 2008 he was included in a list of the 50 best rugby players in the world by The Independent newspaper.

He joined Japanese club NEC Green Rockets in 2007 and made 63 appearances before moving to his new club Newcastle Falcons at the end of the 2015 season.  He has also captained the Tonga national rugby side at international level and has appeared in two Rugby World Cup's. Nili has also played for the Pacific Islanders in the 2006 and 2008 tours.

On 17 April 2015, Latu left Japan to join English club Newcastle Falcons in the Aviva Premiership from the 2015-16 season.

After the 2017–18 Season Finished, Latu announced he would be leaving Newcastle Falcons and Returning to his former club NEC Green Rockets.

On May 22, Latu was named in the Barbarians Squad to Face England in the Quilter Cup fixture. Nili played alongside Falcons teammate Josh Matavesi and helped Barbarians win 63-45 at Twickenham.

References

External links

1982 births
Bay of Plenty rugby union players
Living people
Pacific Islanders rugby union players
Green Rockets Tokatsu players
Chiefs (rugby union) players
Hurricanes (rugby union) players
Rugby union flankers
Tonga international rugby union players
Tongan rugby union players
Tongan expatriate rugby union players
Expatriate rugby union players in New Zealand
Tongan expatriate sportspeople in New Zealand
Expatriate rugby union players in Japan
Tongan expatriate sportspeople in Japan
People from Tongatapu
Hino Red Dolphins players
Newcastle Falcons players
Counties Manukau rugby union players
Rugby union number eights